Pterygoplichthys zuliaensis is a species of catfish in the family Loricariidae. It is a freshwater fish endemic to the Lake Maracaibo basin in Venezuela. It is a facultative air-breather.

References 

Hypostominae
Freshwater fish of Venezuela
Endemic fauna of Venezuela
Fish described in 1991